Figari is a commune in the Corse-du-Sud department of France on the island of Corsica.

Figari may also refer to:

 Antonio Bey Figari (1804–1870), Italian pharmacist and naturalist
 Eduardo Figari, Peruvian Maoist political leader
 Luis Fernando Figari (born 1947), Peruvian Catholic leader
 Pedro Figari (1861–1938), Uruguayan artist, lawyer, writer, and politician
 Figari Award, a Uruguayan art award, named for Pedro Figari

See also
 Club Capitán Figari, a football club based in Lambaré, Paraguay
 Figaro (disambiguation)